Rincon Teixeira da Rocha (born 22 July 1994), known simply as Rincon, is a Brazilian footballer who plays for Cabofriense as a forward.

Club career

Santa Cruz-RJ
Born in Ubá, Minas Gerais, Rincon only played amateur football well into his 20s. In 2017, he joined Santa Cruz-RJ for the Campeonato Carioca Série B2.

Rincon made his senior debut on 25 June 2017, starting and scoring a brace in a 2–2 home draw against Bela Vista. On 21 August, he scored a hat-trick in a 4–2 away defeat of Juventus-RJ, and finished the year with 13 goals in 13 appearances, as his side achieved promotion to the Campeonato Carioca Série B1.

During the 2018 campaign, Rincon scored ten times as his side was relegated back to the third division.

Cabofriense
On 12 November 2018, Rincon joined Cabofriense for the ensuing Campeonato Carioca. He made his debut for the club on 20 January 2019, coming on as a second-half substitute for Rafael and scoring the last in a 3–1 home defeat of Botafogo.

On 2 March 2019, Rincon scored twice in a 4–1 routing at Americano. Fifteen days later, he scored the opener in a 2–0 home success over Vasco da Gama, thus removing the club's unbeaten status in the year.

Career statistics

References

External links

1994 births
Living people
Sportspeople from Minas Gerais
Brazilian footballers
Association football forwards
Associação Desportiva Cabofriense players